Lukáš Matůš (born 6 October 1980) is a Czech footballer who plays as a forward.

References

External links

1980 births
Living people
Czech footballers
Czech expatriate footballers
Association football forwards
Czech First League players
Bohemians 1905 players
1. FC Slovácko players
FK Fotbal Třinec players
FC DAC 1904 Dunajská Streda players
Slovak Super Liga players
SC Ostbahn XI players
Expatriate footballers in Slovakia
Czech expatriate sportspeople in Slovakia
Expatriate footballers in Austria
Czech expatriate sportspeople in Austria